The Irish Chamber Orchestra (ICO) is an Irish classical music ensemble, administratively based at the University of Limerick.
János Fürst founded the ICO in 1963. The ICO consisted only of strings as its regular ensemble for many years, adding wind, brass and percussion players on a freelance basis when needed. The ICO was reformed in 1970 under the name of the New Irish Chamber Orchestra and the principal conductorship of André Prieur. The orchestra first toured North America in 1978. In 1995, the orchestra was again reconstituted, reverting to its original name of the Irish Chamber Orchestra. The ICO formally added horn players and oboes to its roster in 2008.

Overview 
Following a number of artistic directors including Fionnuala Hunt, Nicholas McGegan and Anthony Marwood, the orchestra took a new approach, appointing two artistic partners: Hungarian conductor Gábor Takács-Nagy (Principal Artistic Partner) and the clarinettist and composer Jörg Widmann (Principal Conductor/Artistic Partner). Since May 2022, Thomas Zehetmair has been Principal Conductor and Artistic Partner of the Irish Chamber Orchestra.

The orchestra visits various venues nationwide, and also runs a regular concert season, which takes place in Limerick and Dublin. In the past, the orchestra has also toured across Europe, Australia, South Korea, China and the US.

Irish composers who have worked with the orchestra include Frank Corcoran, Mícheál Ó Súilleabháin, and Bill Whelan.

Plectrum & Bow, a CD release, marked a collaborative recording with US composer and guitarist Steve Mackey. It features his Concerto for Violin and Strings, Four Iconoclastic Episodes, which was jointly commissioned by the Irish Chamber Orchestra, the Academy of St-Martin-in-the-Fields and the DeBartolo Performing Arts Center, University of Notre Dame, US. Other recordings include Night Moves, conducted by Gérard Korsten, and Hommage, which features works by Irish composer John Kinsella.

The Irish Chamber Orchestra is resident at the Irish World Academy of Music and Dance at the University of Limerick and is funded by the Arts Council of Ireland/An Chomhairle Ealaíon.

It owns a custom built studio, which has been acoustically modelled, on campus at UL, Limerick.

Music and artistic directors
 János Fürst
 André Prieur
 Nicholas Kraemer (Artistic Director, 1986–1992)
 Fionnuala Hunt (Music Director, 1995–2002)
 Nicholas McGegan (Music Director, 2002–2005)
 Anthony Marwood (Artistic Director, 2006–2011)
 Jörg Widmann (Principal Guest Conductor/Artistic Partner, 2011–2017; Principal Conductor/Artistic Partner, 2017–2022)
 Gábor Takács-Nagy (Principal Artistic Partner, 2013–date)
 Thomas Zehetmair (Principal Conductor/Artistic Partner, 2022–present)

See also
Something Else (The Cranberries album), a 2017 live album featuring the group

References

External links
 
 Classics Today.com review of Black Box 1013
 Concert programme from 21 November 1978, University Musical Society of the University of Michigan, New Irish Chamber Orchestra concert in Ann Arbor, Michigan, USA

Irish orchestras
University of Limerick
Chamber orchestras
1963 establishments in Ireland
Musical groups established in 1963